My Kids Give Me a Headache is a 2012 South Korean television series, starring Lee Soon-jae, Kim Hae-sook, Yoo Dong-geun and Uhm Ji-won. It is about three generations of the Ahn family who are all living in one house in the suburbs of Seoul, and how they deal with the societal discrimination that their smart and highly educated, eldest granddaughter faces when she becomes a single mother. It aired on cable channel jTBC from October 27, 2012 to March 17, 2013 on Saturdays and Sundays at 20:50 (KST) time slot for 40 episodes.

The series received consistently solid ratings, and its January 26, 2013 episode reached 7.955%, breaking the previous record of Reply 1997 to become the highest viewership ratings that a drama has received on Korean cable. It went on to break its own record for the February 24 episode, with another cable drama all-time rating high of 10.715%.

Cast

Ahn family
Patriarch and Matriarch
 Lee Soon-jae as Ahn Ho-shik 
 Seo Woo-rim as Choi Geum-shil

First son's family
 Yoo Dong-geun as Ahn Hee-jae
 Kim Hae-sook as Lee Ji-ae
 Uhm Ji-won as Ahn So-young
 Ha Seok-jin as Ahn Sung-ki
 Lee Do-yeong as Ahn Joon-ki

Second son's family
 Song Seung-hwan as Ahn Hee-myung 
 Im Ye-jin as Ji Yoo-jung 
 Jung Joon as Ahn Dae-ki 
 Kim Min-kyung as Kang Hyo-joo

Third son's family
 Yoon Da-hoon as Ahn Hee-gyu
 Kyeon Mi-ri as Shin Sae-rom
 Jeon Yang-ja as Shin Young-ja

Supporting
 Oh Yoon-ah as Lee Young-hyun
 Yoo Se-hyung as Min-gyu
 Son Na-eun as Oh Soo-mi
 Kim Young-jae as Kim Chang-ho

Special appearances
 Lee Sang-woo as Ha In-chul
 Kim Ji-sook as In-chul's mother
 Park Hyun-sook as In-chul's sister
 Kim Ha-kyun as barista teacher
 Joo Da-young as single mother
 Kim Kwang-kyu as gas station customer
 Kim In-kwon as Joo Jae-won (the man who went on a blind date with So-young)
 Jung Suk-young as guard
 Hwang In-young as cafe customer
 Im Hyung-joon as clothing store customer 
 Lee Seon-jin as clothing store customer 
 Bang Eun-hee as divorce suit client
 Jung Dong-hwan as In-chul's father in-law
 Kim Bo-yeon as Young-hyun's mother
 Han Jin-hee as Young-hyun's father
 Hong Yeo-jin as Young-hyun's aunt
 Yang Hee-kyung as Young-hyun's aunt
 Ahn Hae-sook as Young-hyun's aunt
 Cho Yeon-woo as Oh Hyun-soo, Young-hyun's friend
 Kim Ji-young as So-young's friend
 Ha Jae-sook as Sun-hwa

International broadcast
 It aired in Vietnam on VTV3 from April 8, 2014 under the title Cuộc sống không con cái.

References

External links
 Childless Comfort official jTBC website
 

2012 South Korean television series debuts
2013 South Korean television series endings
JTBC television dramas
Korean-language television shows
Television shows written by Kim Soo-hyun (writer)
Television series by Samhwa Networks